Gliese 638 is a main sequence star in the constellation of Hercules. It is located about 31.9 light years from the Earth. This is a suspected variable star with a measured apparent magnitude that ranges from 8.09–8.11. As a K-class star, it has a lower mass than the Sun, and consequently is less luminous.

References

Hercules (constellation)
K-type main-sequence stars
151288
0638
082003
Durchmusterung objects